Charles Francis Adams Jr. (May 27, 1835 – March 20, 1915) was an American author, historian, and railroad and park commissioner who served as the president of the Union Pacific Railroad from 1884 to 1890. He served as a colonel in the Union Army during the American Civil War. After the war, he was a railroad regulator and executive, an author of historical works, and a member of the Massachusetts Park Commission.

Early life
Adams was born in Boston, May 27, 1835, into a family with a long legacy in American public life. He was the great-grandson of United States President John Adams and the grandson of President John Quincy Adams. His father Charles Francis Adams Sr. was a lawyer, politician, diplomat, and writer.  His siblings were older sister Louisa Catherine Adams, wife of Charles Kuhn, of Philadelphia; older brother Hon. John Quincy Adams II, father of Charles Francis Adams III;  historian Henry Brooks Adams; Arthur Adams, who died in childhood; Mary Adams, who married Henry Parker Quincy, of Dedham, Massachusetts; and historian Peter Chardon Brooks Adams, of Beverly Farms, Massachusetts, who married Evelyn Davis.

Adams graduated from Harvard University in 1856 and then studied law in the office of Richard Henry Dana Jr. and was admitted to the bar in 1858. In 1895, he received an LL.D. degree from Harvard University.

Civil War

Adams served in the Union Army during the American Civil War.  He was commissioned as a first lieutenant in the 1st Massachusetts Volunteer Cavalry on December 28, 1861. He was promoted to captain on December 1, 1862. He fought with distinction during the Gettysburg Campaign, where his company was heavily engaged at the Battle of Aldie.  When the regiment's 3-year enlistment ended it was reduced to a battalion, and Adams was mustered out of service on September 1, 1864.

On September 8, 1864, he was commissioned as the lieutenant colonel of the 5th Massachusetts Cavalry (officially designated "5th Massachusetts Colored Volunteer Cavalry"). He was promoted to colonel and assumed command of the regiment on March 14, 1865, shortly before the end of the war. When he assumed command, the regiment was assigned guarding Confederate prisoners of war at Point Lookout, Maryland.

Adams, who wished to lead his regiment in combat, was able to get horses for his regiment and had it reassigned to front-line duty during the closing days of the campaign against Richmond. Adams wrote in his autobiography that he regretted having his unit reassigned since he came to the conclusion that the regiment's black soldiers were ill-suited for combat duty. He led his regiment into Richmond shortly after it was captured in April 1865. Adams returned to Massachusetts in May due to illness (probably dysentery) and resigned from the Army on August 1, 1865.

On July 9, 1866, President Andrew Johnson nominated Colonel Adams for the award of the rank of brevet (honorary) brigadier general, United States Volunteers, "for distinguished gallantry and efficiency at the battles of Secessionville, South Carolina and South Mountain and Antietam, Maryland, and for meritorious services during the war" to rank from March 13, 1865, and the U. S. Senate confirmed the award on July 23, 1866.

Adams was a Veteran Companion of the Massachusetts Commandery of the Military Order of the Loyal Legion of the United States (MOLLUS).

Railroad reformer

Massachusetts Railroad Commission
Following the Civil War, he was appointed to the Massachusetts Railroad Commission. There he attempted to persuade (rather than coerce) railroads into compliance with accepted business norms. Thomas McCraw called Adams's approach to regulation "the Sunshine Commission," because the purpose of the commission was to expose the corrupt business practices in the hope that, once out in the open, the businessmen would be shamed into mending their ways. It was in this vein that he wrote Chapters of Erie. However, true to his regulatory philosophy, he favored the protection of businessmen over that of the consumers. He saw regulation as necessary to protect investors and other businessmen from the capriciousness of a hostile public or the machinations of other unscrupulous stock jobbers.

Union Pacific Railroad
Congress distrusted the Union Pacific Railroad (UP) and in 1884 forced it to hire Adams as the new president. Adams had long promoted various reform ideas, as in his book Railroads, Their Origin and Problems (1878), but he had little practical experience in management. As railroad president, he was successful in getting a good press for the UP, and he set up libraries along the route to allow his employees to better themselves. He had poor results dealing with the Knights of Labor. When the union refused extra work in Wyoming in 1885, Adams hired Chinese workers. The result was the Rock Springs massacre, which killed scores of Chinese and drove all the rest out of Wyoming. He tried to build a complex network of alliances with other businesses, but they provided little help to the UP. He had great difficulty in making decisions and in coordinating his subordinates. Adams was unable to stanch the worsening financial condition of the UP, and in 1890 the railroad's owner Jay Gould forced him to resign.

Historian

Adams was elected a Fellow of the American Academy of Arts and Sciences in 1871 and a member of the American Antiquarian Society in 1891.

After 1874, he devoted much of his time to the study of American history. In recognition of his work, Adams became vice-president of the  Massachusetts Historical Society in 1890, he was chosen president of this society in 1895 and the American Historical Association in 1901. His writings and addresses on problems of railway management and other historical subjects frequently gave rise to widespread controversy.

In 1875, he published an essay on "The Granger Movement" in the North American Review. It exposed the railroad rate rigging and monopoly practices that prompted the movement.

Adams also wrote an autobiography, completed in 1912 and published posthumously in 1916. At the beginning of the autobiography is a memorial address about Adams written by Henry Cabot Lodge.

Philanthropic activity

Massachusetts Park Commission
From 1893 to 1895, he was chairman of the Massachusetts Park Commission, and as such took a prominent part in planning the present park system of the state.  He was influential in establishing the Blue Hills Reservation and the Middlesex Fells Reservation.

Single-tax supporter
In 1900, he wrote a letter to the President of the Massachusetts Single Tax League, declaring himself a supporter of the reform Henry George had proposed, which would later be known as Georgism. An excerpt of that letter appeared in The Outlook, December 15, 1900.

National Civic Confederation
Adams represented the public on the board of arbitration in the industrial department of the National Civic Confederation in New York city, December 17, 1901.

Personal life
On November 8, 1865, he married Mary Hone Ogden (1843–1934), daughter of Edward and Caroline Callender Ogden. The couple had three daughters and twin sons, both of whom graduated from Harvard in 1898. The five children were:
 Mary Ogden ("Molly") Adams (b. 1867), who married Grafton St. Loe Abbott (1856–1915), a son of U.S. Representative Josiah Gardner Abbott. They were the parents of Mary Ogden Abbott.
 Louisa Catherine Adams (1872–1958), who married Thomas Nelson Perkins (1870–1937).
 Elizabeth Ogden ("Elise") Adams (1873–1945).
 John Francis Adams (1875–1964), who married Marian Morse Adams (1878–1959).  They were the parents of Thomas Boylston Adams.
 Henry Quincy Adams (1875–1951).

Death and burial
Adams died May 20, 1915. He is buried in Mount Wollaston Cemetery in Quincy, Massachusetts.

Works
 Chapters of Erie, and Other Essays (New York, 1871), with brother Henry Adams
 Railroads, Their Origin and Problems (New York, 1878)
 Notes on Railroad Accidents (New York, 1879)
 Richard Henry Dana: A Biography (Boston, 1890)
 Three Episodes of Massachusetts History (Boston, 1892), a work that gives an account of the settlement of Boston Bay, of the Antinomian controversy, and of church and town government in early Massachusetts
 Massachusetts: Its Historians and Its History (Boston, 1893)
 Antinomianism in the Colony of Massachusetts Bay, 1636–1638 (1894)
  (1898).
 Charles Francis Adams (Boston and New York, 1900), in the American Statesmen series (biography of Charles Francis Adams Sr.)
 Lee at Appomattox, and Other Papers (1902)
 "Reflex Light From Africa," The Century Magazine, vol. 72, pp. 101-111 (1906)
 "Lee's Centennial: An Address by Charles Francis Adams Delivered at Lexington Virginia Saturday January 19 1907"
 Whence the Founders Travel  (1907)
 "'The Solid South' and the Afro-American Race Problem," "Speech of Charles Francis Adams at the Academy of Music, Richmond, Va., Saturday Evening, 24 October, 1908" 
 Published as a book, with "A few changes in language ... and a paragraph added." Boston, 1912
 Tis Sixty Years Since. Address of Charles Francis Adams, Founders' Day, January 16, 1913, University of South Carolina (New York, 1913)
 Charles Francis Adams, 1835–1915: An Autobiography (1916)
 Before and After the Treaty of Washington: The American Civil War and the War in the Transvaal. An address delivered before the New York Historical Society on its ninety-seventh anniversary, Tuesday, November 19, 1901 (New York, 1902)

Family tree

See also

List of Massachusetts generals in the American Civil War
List of railroad executives
Massachusetts in the American Civil War

References

Bibliography
 De Gruccio, Michael, "Manhood, Race, Failure, and Reconciliation: Charles Francis Adams Jr. and the American Civil War," The New England Quarterly, Vol. 81, No. 4 (Dec., 2008), pp. 636-675.
 Egerton, Douglas, "The Fall of the House of Adams: Charles Francis Adams Jr. on Race and Public Service," We're History, November 25, 2019.
 Egerton, Douglas R. Heirs of an Honored Name: The Decline of the Adams Family and the Rise of Modern America. Basic Books, 2019.
 Eicher, John H. and Eicher, David J., Civil War High Commands. Stanford University Press, Stanford, CA, 2001. .
 Garrett, Mrs. Wendell, "The Published Writings of Charles Francis Adams, II (1835-1915): An Annotated Checklist," Proceedings of the Massachusetts Historical Society, Third Series, Vol. 72 (Oct., 1957 - Dec., 1960), pp. 238-293.
 Hunt, Roger D. and Brown, Jack R., Brevet Brigadier Generals in Blue. Olde Soldier Books, Inc., Gaithersburg, MD, 1990. .
 Kirkland, Edward Chase, Charles Francis Adams, Jr., 1835–1915: The Patrician at Bay. Cambridge: Harvard University Press, 1965.
 McCraw, Thomas K. Prophets of Regulation: Charles Francis Adams, Louis D. Brandeis, James M. Landis, Alfred E. Kahn. Cambridge: Belknap Press of Harvard University Press, 1984.

External links

 
 (1913)
 
Notes on Railroad Accidents, 1879
Shall Cromwell Have a Statue?, 1902

1835 births
1915 deaths
19th-century American railroad executives
Adams, Charles Francis II
19th-century American historians
19th-century American male writers
Fellows of the American Academy of Arts and Sciences
Harvard University alumni
Historians of the United States
Members of the American Academy of Arts and Letters
Members of the American Philosophical Society
People from Quincy, Massachusetts
People of Massachusetts in the American Civil War
Presidents of the American Historical Association
Union Army colonels
United States Army officers
Union Pacific Railroad people
Members of the American Antiquarian Society
Historians from Massachusetts
American male non-fiction writers